This article provides two lists:
A list of National Basketball Association players by total career playoff steals recorded.
A progressive list of steals leaders showing how the record increased through the years.

Playoff steals leaders
This is a list of National Basketball Association players by total career playoff steals recorded.

Statistics accurate as of the 2022 NBA playoffs.

Progressive list for steals
This is a progressive list of steals leaders showing how the record has increased through the years.
Statistics accurate as of the 2022 NBA playoffs.

See also
Basketball statistics
NBA post-season records

References

External links
Basketball-Reference.com enumeration of NBA career playoff leaders in steals

National Basketball Association lists
National Basketball Association statistical leaders